Wasaya Airways LP (or in Oji-Cree ᐙᐦᓭᔮ ᐱᒥᐦᓭᐎᐣ (Waaseyaa Bimisewin); unpointed: ᐗᓭᔭ ᐱᒥᓭᐎᐣ) is a First Nations-owned domestic airline with its headquarters in Thunder Bay, Ontario, Canada. Its main hubs are the Thunder Bay International Airport and the Sioux Lookout Airport; however, it also offers a charter and cargo service from a base in Red Lake Airport and Pickle Lake Airport. In 2003, Wasaya Airways bought the rights to serve remote First Nations communities from Bearskin Airlines. The airline also supplies food, clothing, hardware and other various supplies to 25 remote communities in Ontario.

History

Established in 1989 as Kelner Airways, it was renamed Wasaya in 1993. The new name comes from the Oji-Cree language, which means "it is bright" in English, in reference to the brightness of the rising Sun.

Over the years, the airline has grown from a floatplane operation to a charter and scheduled passenger service airline.

Its inflight magazine Sagatay is published in conjunction with Wawatay Native Communications Society.

In October 2010, the company purchased a De Havilland Canada Dash 8 to bolster its fleet.

Destinations

Scheduled services
Wasaya Airways serves the following destinations in Ontario:

 Bearskin Lake First Nation (Bearskin Lake Airport), owner community
 Deer Lake First Nation (Deer Lake Airport)
 Eabametoong First Nation (Fort Hope) (Fort Hope Airport)
 Fort Severn First Nation (Fort Severn Airport), owner community
 Kasabonika Lake First Nation (Kasabonika Airport), owner community
 Keewaywin First Nation (Keewaywin Airport), owner community
 Kingfisher First Nation (Kingfisher Lake Airport), owner community
 Kitchenuhmaykoosib Inninuwug First Nation (Big Trout Lake) (Big Trout Lake Airport), owner community
 Muskrat Dam Lake First Nation (Muskrat Dam Airport), owner community
 Neskantaga First Nation (Lansdowne House) (Lansdowne House Airport)
 Nibinamik First Nation (Summer Beaver), (Summer Beaver Airport), owner community
 North Caribou Lake First Nation (Weagamow Lake) (Round Lake (Weagamow Lake) Airport)
 North Spirit Lake First Nation (North Spirit Lake Airport)
 Pickle Lake (Pickle Lake Airport), hub
 Pikangikum First Nation (Pikangikum Airport), owner community
 Poplar Hill First Nation (Poplar Hill Airport)
 Red Lake (Red Lake Airport), hub
 Sachigo Lake First Nation (Sachigo Lake Airport)
 Sandy Lake First Nation (Sandy Lake Airport), owner community
 Sioux Lookout (Sioux Lookout Airport), hub
 Thunder Bay (Thunder Bay International Airport), hub
 Wapekeka First Nation (Angling Lake/Wapekeka Airport), owner community
 Webequie First Nation (Webequie Airport)
 Wunnumin Lake First Nation (Wunnumin Lake Airport), owner community

Fleet
As of December 2020, Wasaya Airways had 20 aircraft listed on their website and 22 aircraft registered with Transport Canada.

The Transport Canada website also shows a  Beechcraft 1900 and a  Pilatus PC-12 with cancelled registration certificates.

Accidents and incidents
 On 11 September 2003, a Cessna 208B Grand Caravan of Wasaya Airways Flight 125 crashed near Summer Beaver, killing all eight persons on board. The Transportation Safety Board of Canada was unable to determine the cause.
 On 12 June 2012, a Wasaya Airways Hawker Siddeley HS 748 caught fire while unloading JET A-1 jet fuel at Sandy Lake Airport in Northwestern Ontario. No injuries were reported. The aircraft burned to the ground, and only the left wing and nacelle survived.
The pilot was the sole occupant and was killed in the crash. The probable cause for the accident was flying in known or forecast icing conditions although the aircraft was prohibited from doing that, and a high take-off weight that increased the severity of degraded performance when the flight encountered icing conditions.

References

External links

 Wasaya Airways
 Wasaya Group

Air Transport Association of Canada
Airlines established in 1989
Companies based in Thunder Bay
Regional airlines of Ontario
1989 establishments in Ontario
First Nations in Ontario